Simion Samuel Deutsch (1900 – 1970) was a Romanian footballer who played as a striker.

International career
Simion Deutsch played one friendly match for Romania, on 26 October 1923 under coach Constantin Rădulescu in a 2–2 against Turkey.

References

External links
 

1900 births
1970 deaths
Romanian footballers
Romania international footballers
Place of birth missing
Association football forwards
Liga I players
FC Universitatea Cluj players
FC Petrolul Ploiești players